The 1994 FIBA Europe Under-20 Championship (known at that time as 1994 European Championship for Men 'Under22 and Under') was the second edition of the FIBA Europe Under-20 Championship. The cities of Maribor, Postojna and Ljubljana, in Slovenia, hosted the tournament. Belarus won their first title.

Qualification

Qualified teams

Squads

Preliminary round
The twelve teams were allocated in two groups of six teams each.

Group A

Group B

Knockout stage

9th–12th playoffs

5th–8th playoffs

Championship

Final standings

References
FIBA Archive
FIBA Europe Archive

 
FIBA U20 European Championship
1994–95 in European basketball
1994 in Slovenian sport
International youth basketball competitions hosted by Slovenia